The Buthier is a mountain torrent in north-west Italy. A left bank tributary of the Dora Baltea, its entire course lies within the Valpelline, a valley in the region of Aosta Valley.

Course 
The river is then dammed to form the Place-Moulin Lake reservoir, after which it passes through the communes of Bionaz, Oyace, Valpelline, Roisan and finally Aosta where it joins the Dora Baltea.

Tributaries
The principal tributaries from the left are:
 Rû Verdonaz
 Vessonaz;
and from the right:
 Ollomont
 Artanavaz.

Bridges
 Pont de Pierre, a Roman bridge from the time of Augustus (r. 30 BC –14 AD)

Notes
This article began as a translation from its counterpart in the Italian Wikipedia, specifically from this version

Rivers of Aosta Valley
Rivers of Italy
Rivers of the Alps